Linderman is a surname. Notable people with the surname include:

People 
Fannie B. Linderman (1875-1960), British-born American teacher, entertainer, and writer
Frank Bird Linderman (1869-1938), Montana writer, Native American ally and ethnographer
Henry Linderman (1825–1879), American financier
Rodney Anonymous' lesser known real surname
Vladimir Linderman (1958), a Latvian and Russian publicist and political dissident

In fiction 
Mr. Daniel Linderman, fictional character on the television series Heroes

See also
Lindemann
Linderman Lake

References